During the early evening of Friday, May 31, 2013, a very large and powerful tornado occurred over rural areas of Central Oklahoma. This rain-wrapped, multiple-vortex tornado was the widest tornado ever recorded and was part of a larger weather system that produced dozens of tornadoes over the preceding days. Remaining over mostly open terrain, the tornado did not impact many structures; however, measurements from mobile weather radars revealed extreme winds up to  within the vortex. These are among the highest observed wind speeds on Earth, just slightly lower than the wind speeds of the 1999 Bridge Creek–Moore tornado. Turning northeastward, the tornado soon weakened.

The tornado killed four storm chasers, the first known deaths in the history of storm chasing. Although the tornado remained over mostly open terrain, dozens of storm chasers unaware of its immense size and erratic movement were caught off-guard. Near U.S. 81, TWISTEX scientist and engineer Tim Samaras, along with his son Paul and research partner Carl Young, died in the tornado. Paul Samaras and Young were ejected from their Chevrolet Cobalt by the storm's sub-vortex, while Tim was still buckled in the passenger's seat. Local resident Richard Henderson, who decided to follow the storm, lost his life in that same area. He snapped a picture of the tornado from his cellular phone before it struck him. Other chasers, including Mike Bettes of The Weather Channel and Reed Timmer, were either injured or had their vehicles damaged. A Doppler on Wheels-based analysis of how the tornado impacted these teams revealed that they were hit by an intense internal sub-vortex. Overall, the tornado was responsible for eight fatalities and 151 injuries. Due to the ferocity and sheer size, as well as its irregular movement and the deaths linked with this tornado, it has become one of the most studied and infamous tornadoes ever. The National Weather Service referred to the tornado as "the most dangerous tornado in storm observing history."

Alongside rush hour traffic, thousands of residents in Oklahoma City attempted to outrun the storm by taking to the roads in an attempt to drive out of the tornado's projected path. By attempting to escape the storm by vehicle, in direct contrast to the recommended plan of action, residents put themselves at great risk from the storm; had the tornado maintained itself and passed over the congested freeways, more than 500 lives could have been lost.

Meteorological synopsis 

On May 31, 2013, a prominent mid-to-upper level trough and closed mid-level low pressure area moved east-northeastward, with a lead upper low pivoting over the Dakotas and Upper Midwest region. A moderately strong polar jet moved east-northeastward over the southern Rocky Mountains to the southern Great Plains. With a broad influence of moderately strong cyclonic flow aloft, the air mass was expected to become unstable across much of the southern Great Plains, through the Upper Midwest and Mississippi Valley, by the afternoon.

Dewpoint values had ranged from the upper 60s °F (20 °C) to the lower 70s °F (20–22 °C), with temperatures in the low to mid-80s °F (27–30 °C), and CAPE (a meteorological concept used to predict the force and power of potential storms and tornadoes) predicting referring to values ranging from 3500 to 5000 J/kg. Deep layer wind shear speeds of  would enhance storm organization and intensity. These factors, along with CAPE values in excess of 4000 J/kg and an embedded speed maxima rotating around the southern periphery of the low, made the threat of significant severe thunderstorms increasingly likely. These ingredients were present ahead of a cold front extending from the low from the eastern Dakotas southwestward to western Oklahoma, and ahead of a dry line extending from western Oklahoma southward into western north and west-central Texas. The most intense severe weather activity was expected across the southern Great Plains, specifically central and eastern Oklahoma, during the afternoon hours. As such, the Storm Prediction Center (SPC) issued a moderate risk of severe thunderstorms during the early morning hours of May 31 from southeastern Missouri to southwestern Oklahoma. The degree of wind shear, moisture and instability within the warm sector favored the development of discrete supercells. Very large hail and tornadoes were expected with the supercells, with the possibility of a few strong to violent tornadoes.

At 3:30 p.m. Central Daylight Time (CDT) early that afternoon, the SPC issued a Particularly Dangerous Situation Tornado Watch from southwestern through northeastern Oklahoma, surrounding the Interstate 44 corridor.

Storm development and track 

A quasi-linear complex of thunderstorms began developing near the Highway 81 corridor west of Oklahoma City between 4:00 and 4:45 p.m. CDT, and rapidly reached severe intensity. At 5:33 p.m. CDT (2233 UTC), the National Weather Service Weather Forecast Office in Norman, Oklahoma issued a tornado warning for Canadian County, prompted by increasingly strong tornadic circulation exhibited in the southernmost supercell of this complex.

The tornado ultimately attained EF3 intensity during its existence, according to ground surveys. At 6:28 p.m. CDT (2328 UTC), the storm began moving into more densely populated areas of Canadian County while maintaining its intensity. This prompted the National Weather Service office in Norman to issue a tornado emergency for Yukon, Richland, Wiley Post Airport, Bethany, The Village, and eastern El Reno, as the tornado was projected to track toward western portions of the Oklahoma City metropolitan area. Within minutes, the tornado turned northeast and soon passed directly over Interstate 40 at around 6:42 p.m. CDT (2342 UTC). Shortly thereafter, the tornado lifted off the ground as it neared Banner Road. Overall, the tornado was on the ground for 40 minutes along a  path.

A strong anticyclonic multivortex satellite tornado also formed southeast of the primary tornado at approximately 6:28 pm CDT (2328 UTC), and remained on the ground for 15 minutes before lifting at 6:43 (2343 UTC). Such companion tornadoes tend to be observed with especially large and intense tornadoes, although this was the first documented multiple-vortex anticyclonic tornado of this kind.

Intensity 

The intensity of the tornado has been a subject of internal debate within the National Oceanic and Atmospheric Administration. The agency utilizes the Enhanced Fujita Scale to rate and assess tornado intensity based on the damage left behind. This excludes the use of supplementary measurements, such as those from mobile radar, in concluding a tornado's intensity. Initially receiving an official EF3 rating based on damage, the El Reno tornado was subsequently upgraded to a radar-estimated EF5 rating, the highest on the scale, based on data from a mobile radar. These winds are considered the second-highest ever measured worldwide, just shy of the  recorded during the 1999 Bridge Creek–Moore tornado.

The strongest winds occurred in small subvortices along the south side of the main vortex.

Rick Smith, the warning coordination meteorologist at the National Weather Service Weather Forecast Office in Norman, stated that this tornado was among a "super-rare" category within the EF5 rating. Smith also stated that it was fortunate the tornado did not track into more densely populated areas, particularly those within the Oklahoma City metropolitan area, "this would have been … I don't even want to imagine what it would have been." William Hooke, a senior policy fellow at the American Meteorological Society stated that, "[Oklahoma City] dodged a bullet...You lay that path over Oklahoma City, and you have devastation of biblical proportions."

On August 30, the National Weather Service office in Norman once again revised the intensity of the El Reno tornado. Keli Pirtle, a Public Affairs worker at the National Oceanic and Atmospheric Administration, stated that, "despite the radar-measured wind speeds, the survey team did not find damage that would support a rating higher than EF3. While the wind measurements from the mobile radars are considered reliable, NWS policy for determining EF-ratings is based on surveys of ground damage." The lack of EF5 damage was likely a result of the rural nature of the area, as the sub-vortices that contained the EF5 wind speeds did not impact any structures.

Storm chaser incidents 

Several professional and amateur chasers were caught off guard and impacted by the tornado. Many were located in a region northeast of the tornado, known as the "bear's cage". Chasers can generally get a clear view of the tornado from that area; however, it places them at great risk and with little time to react should the storm take a left turn.

In the case of El Reno, the wrapping rain bands did not lead to a narrow corridor of clear air close to the tornado. Rather, these rotating curtains of rain were the outer circulation of the tornado itself. Former Discovery Channel storm chaser Tim Samaras (an engineer), his son Paul Samaras (a photographer), and Tim's longtime chase partner Carl Young (a meteorologist), all professional storm chasers with the TWISTEX project, were caught directly by the tornado; all three died in their vehicle, two of them were ejected. Normally, Tim drove a reinforced three-quarter ton truck optimized for hail protection and stability in high winds; however, on May 31, Carl was driving an unmodified Chevrolet Cobalt, a subcompact vehicle with three 45-lb barometric probes in the trunk likened by one TWISTEX chaser to a "pizza delivery car", making it much less suited to high winds and rain-slicked backcountry dirt roads. It was also underpowered, which hampered their escape in the strong inflow winds. Tim's body was found still buckled in the passenger's seat. They were the first known tornado-related deaths of either recreational storm chasers or scientific researchers.

Mike Bettes, a meteorologist for The Weather Channel, was also caught in the storm. Meteorologist Emily Sutton and storm chaser Kevin Josefy of Oklahoma City NBC affiliate KFOR-TV (channel 4) were also caught in the path of the storm; their vehicle was damaged by debris hurled by the tornado. University of Oklahoma student Billy Prater, along with his father and a friend, sought refuge under an overpass (an action strongly discouraged in these situations) when the tornado changed direction. Near Union City, debris from a barn destroyed by the tornado struck the vehicle of Brandon Sullivan and Brett Wright, breaking their windshield; they escaped without injury. The hood of Reed Timmer's Dominator 2, a vehicle designed for intercepting tornadoes, was torn off by lines that were down from the tornado. Storm chaser Dan Robinson received injuries after being enveloped within the outskirts of the tornadic circulation. He escaped a few hundred meters ahead of the TWISTEX crew and is believed to be the last person to see Samaras, his son Paul and Young.

A Doppler on Wheels-based analysis of how the tornado impacted these teams revealed that they were hit by an intense internal sub-vortex. Entering the larger tornadic circulation without the ability to maintain situational awareness of the internal sub-vortex was likely a key contributing factor to the deaths and injuries.

Response 

In the wake of the storm chaser deaths, Kansas Emergency Management Association president Brian Stone called for there to be regulations put on future storm chasing; however, he stated that there are questions as to how it would actually be implemented. AccuWeather Senior Vice President Mike Smith urged against overreacting to their deaths, citing that they were the first chasers to be killed in 40 years of the practice and that chasing as a whole is a significant source of real-time and research information.

On June 2, dozens of members of the storm chasing and spotting communities coordinated a tribute to Tim Samaras, Paul Samaras, and Carl Young. Using GPS transponders over Spotter Network, they aligned themselves to spell out the initials of the three men in North Dakota, South Dakota and Nebraska for many hours. The Discovery Channel scheduled a special tribute episode of Storm Chasers titled Mile Wide Tornado: Oklahoma Disaster on June 5, both honoring the three chasers and covering the events of the EF5-rated tornado that struck Moore and portions of southern Oklahoma City eleven days earlier on May 20. The November 2013 issue of National Geographic, for its featured cover story, paid tribute to Tim Samaras, a National Geographic Explorer funded in part by the Society, and featured a detailed scientific analysis of the tornado itself.

A team of scientists and veteran chasers embarked on a crowd-sourcing survey project to gather storm chaser information, including video and photographic recordings and GPS logs, to piece together precisely what happened. It is, as of February 2014, the largest such visual data set ever collected on a tornado. The chaser information is compiled with radar and lightning data and the project is intended to eventually expand to a standardized open access database covering future events. In association with the project, software was unveiled in 2015 allowing for the synchronization of maps, radar data, and storm chasers' footage of the storm. The tool was named "Tornado Environment Display" (TED) after Dr. Ted Fujita. Anton Seimon, one of the tool's architects, said that while the tool had only been used in relation to the El Reno tornado, it could potentially be applied to future tornadoes with sufficient footage as well.

Casualties and impact 

Since the tornado remained over mostly open terrain, damage was relatively light – although still significant in isolated locations – in comparison to its extreme intensity. Surveys from the National Weather Service revealed that structures in its path sustained EF3-level damage at most. The Oklahoma City West Livestock Market was described as a "war zone," sustaining extensive damage. Several large steel-frame warehouse type buildings were destroyed at that location. Multiple large brick buildings at the nearby Canadian Valley Technology Center were heavily damaged or destroyed, and a large metal wind turbine prop blade was thrown  into the side of a daycare building on the property. Damage totals at that location alone were estimated at up to $40 million. One farmstead, consisting of a large barn, a cattle barn, three machine sheds, granaries and the owner's home, was also completely destroyed. Several other rural homes were destroyed, and large amounts of gravel was blown off of gravel roads in the area, with only the dirt underneath left at some locations. Several large metal electrical transmission poles were downed, trees were snapped and defoliated, and multiple vehicles were tossed from roadways in the area. At least 29 buildings and 40 vehicles were damaged or destroyed by the tornado, with repairs in the El Reno area expected to take at least a year.

On June 1, the American Red Cross set up a shelter at the Redlands Community College in El Reno for victims of the storm. The following day, Oklahoma Governor Mary Fallin toured damaged areas of El Reno. Due to the tornadoes that occurred previously on May 20, a state of emergency was already in place for the affected areas, allowing residents to quickly obtain emergency assistance. Residents left homeless were provided with temporary housing constructed from shipping containers. Each container was fitted with a kitchen, bedroom, living room, and bathroom.

Overall, eight people lost their lives as a result of the tornado, all of whom were killed in vehicles. Local hospitals in Oklahoma City, including OU Medical Center and INTEGRIS Southwest Medical Center, and Mercy Hospital in El Reno, reported receiving at least 115 injured, including five critical patients. Overall, 151 injuries were attributed to the tornado.

Evacuations 

As the tornadoes approached the Oklahoma City metro, thousands of residents decided to leave the area for safety, possibly due to the still fresh memories of the devastation caused by the EF5 tornado that struck Moore on May 20. Already congested with rush hour traffic, Interstates 35, 40, 44 and 240, became "parking lots" as the storms neared. Residents reported the highways to be a scene of chaos, "people were going southbound in the northbound lanes. Everybody was running for their lives." It has been suggested that the evacuation was partially caused by a controversial call to action on-air by KFOR-TV chief meteorologist Mike Morgan, who suggested on-air during coverage of the storm – as the tornado was projected to track into Oklahoma City – that residents without underground storm shelters or safe rooms get into their cars and evacuate south of the track. This advice was contrary to the recommended plan to go to an interior room, bathtub or closet with no windows if no basement or other underground shelter is available. These locations are typically much safer than an automobile in tornadic winds. Dr. Jeff Masters of Weather Underground stated that had the tornado tracked directly over one of the congested highways, the death toll could have easily exceeded 500.

See also 
 List of North American tornadoes and tornado outbreaks
 List of tornadoes with confirmed satellite tornadoes
 Tornado outbreak sequence of May 21–26, 2011
 2011 El Reno–Piedmont tornado – An EF5-rated tornado with recorded wind speeds similar in strength to the 2013 storm that impacted areas near El Reno about two years prior

Notes

References

External links 

 
 
 
 
 
 

2013 in Oklahoma
2013 natural disasters in the United States
F3 tornadoes
Tornadoes in Oklahoma
Tornadoes of 2013
Articles containing video clips
May 2013 events in the United States
Satellite tornadoes